Preethi Geethi Ityaadi is a 2014 Indian Kannada-language film directed by Viru Veerendra, starring Pawan Wadeyar, Sangeetha Bhat, Rangayana Raghu and Vinaya Prasad‌ in lead roles.

Cast

 Pawan Wadeyar 
 Sangeetha Bhat as Nandita 
 Rangayana Raghu
 Vinaya Prasad

Music

Reception

Critical response 

Shyam Prasad S of the Bangalore Mirror wrote "The film promises a lot, but does not deliver. The plot may be old, but if you want to check how the new brigade of Sandalwood is shaping up, Preeti Geethi Ityadi could be the perfect stop". Deccan Chronicle scored the film at 1 out of 2 stars and says "Pavan's entry in her life gives her a glimmer of hope and falls in love. With guilt conscious pricking Pavan, he finally tells the truth to Nandini's mother. Fearing rejection, Pavan distances from Nandini. The two good numbers scored by Veer Samarth including the popular tirboki takataka are the few saving grace for the movie. Will the accidental love meets the fatal end, watch it with caution!" Sify wrote "Pavan has tried his best in acting and needs lot of improvisation especially while doing emotional scenes. Vinaya Prasad and other?s roles crafted nicely and are executed well. Yogaraj Bhat and Jayanth Kaikini's lyrics and Veer Samarth?s music are worth listening to. Over all it is a movie worth watching once if you are a movie buff!" A Shardhha of The New Indian Express wrote "This could have been a much better film with more attention to detail. Verdict: Minimal dialogues, spatial disorientation and an overdone story does not make for an unconventional film".

References

External links 
 

2014 romantic drama films
2010s Kannada-language films
2014 films
Indian romantic drama films